Ramón García Hernando (November 28, 1961, Bilbao, Biscay, Spain) is a Spanish radio and television presenter. He is also known as Ramontxu or Ramonchu in Spain, which in euskera is a colloquial form of calling a person named "Ramón".

Professional career
His long professional career and his versatility have made Ramon García an indisputable standard in the Spanish media. 
 
His career started in the radio, after entering a DJ contest in Biscay in 1983 and being proclaimed the winner by the Cadena SER managers. He also worked for other famous stations, such as Los 40 Principales and Radio Euskadi.

He then jumped into the TV scene in 1989, having a small role in Euskal Telebista. Finally, he emerged as a TV star in 1991 when signing for Televisión Española.

Hosting very popular TV shows and presenting various radio programmes, his role in the Campanadas from Puerta del Sol every 31 December midnight for more than a decade made him a well known star. He has won several prizes in Spain, including 5 TP de Oro.

In 2007 and after 15 years working for TVE, he signed for Antena 3 to host the Spanish version of Are you smarter than a 5th grader?. The announcement of his presence on the Campanadas night for Antena 3 has been a nationwide shock in Spain, as his role on TVE was seen as a Christmas tradition.

Television

References

1961 births
Living people
Spanish radio presenters
People from Bilbao
Spanish television personalities
Spanish game show hosts